The Kom language, Itaŋikom, is the language spoken by the Kom people of Cameroon. Shultz 1997a and Shultz 1997b (available online) contain a comprehensive description of the language's grammar.

Kom is a tonal language with three tones.

Phonology

Consonants

Vowels

Orthography 
Kom uses a 29-character Latin-script orthography based on the General Alphabet of Cameroon Languages.  It contains 20 single characters from the ISO set, six digraphs, and three special characters: barred I (Ɨɨ), eng (Ŋŋ), and an apostrophe (’). The digraphs ae and oe are also written as ligatures æ and œ, respectively.

Although Kom has eight phonetic tones, only two are marked in writing: the low tone [] is written with a grave accent (◌̀) over the vowel (e.g. kàe [] "four"), and the high-low falling tone [] is written with a circumflex (◌̂) over the vowel (e.g. kâf [] "armpit").

References

Bibliography
 Shultz, George, 1997a, Kom Language Grammar Sketch Part 1, SIL Cameroon
 Shultz, George, 1997b, Notes on Discourse features of Kom Narrative Texts, SIL Cameroon
 Jones, Randy, compiler. 2001. Provisional Kom - English lexcion. Yaoundé, Cameroon: SIL

External links
 Kom - English dictionary
 Article about Kom language

Ring languages
Languages of Cameroon